George John Blewett (9 December 1873 – 9 August 1912) was a Canadian philosopher and theologian.

Biography
Born on 9 December 1873, in Yarmouth Township in Elgin County, Ontario, the son of William Blewett, a farmer, and Mary Baker, he was raised on a farm near St. Thomas, Ontario. In 1897, he graduated from Victoria University in the University of Toronto. He studied at the University of Würzburg in 1899 and received a Doctor of Philosophy degree in philosophy in 1900 from Harvard University. He also did postgraduate work at Oxford University and Cambridge University.

In 1901, he became a lecturer in philosophy at Wesley College, Winnipeg. In 1906, he became the Ryerson Professor of moral philosophy at Victoria University. In 1907, he wrote The Study of Nature and the Vision of God: With Other Essays in Philosophy. His second book The Christian View of the World was published in 1912.

He drowned while swimming, apparently the result of a heart attack, in Go Home Bay, Ontario, on 15 August 1912. He was buried in the Necropolis Cemetery.

References

Footnotes

Bibliography

 
 
 
 
 

1873 births
1912 deaths
20th-century Canadian philosophers
20th-century Protestant theologians
Canadian ethicists
Canadian Methodist ministers
Canadian Methodist theologians
Christian ethicists
Harvard Graduate School of Arts and Sciences alumni
Hegelian philosophers
Idealists
Methodist philosophers
People from Elgin County
Philosophers of religion
University of Toronto alumni
Academic staff of the University of Toronto
Burials at Toronto Necropolis
University of Würzburg alumni